"Way with Words" is a song by Canadian musician Bahamas. The song is featured as the second single from his 2018 album Earthtones, and was released on December 1, 2017.

Release 
The song was released on December 1, 2017.

Music video 
A music video for the song was released on Bahamas's YouTube on December 1, 2017.

Charts

References 

2018 songs
Canadian folk songs